MINX (born Rachel Phillips on April 17, 1983, in Sydney) is an Australian DJ and producer. She was formerly signed to EMI Music Australia, which is part of Universal Music Australia. MINX toured the world before she won a national competition aimed at unearthing female DJs, called She Can DJ, in 2011. 

Phillips has also performed under the name Rachel May, working in the more melodic side of house music. In 2013 she co-hosted The Weekend on Australian cable TV. She had a radio show on Nova in Adelaide for 2 years in 2007. She co-hosted a travel documentary through South East Asia for Topdeck Travel on Channel V Australia.

Discography

EPs

Singles

References

External links 

 
 
 
 

Australian DJs
Australian record producers
Living people
1983 births
21st-century Australian singers